Trade Mark Of Quality (abbreviated TMOQ or TMQ) was a bootleg record label based in Los Angeles, California,and was established in 1970 by "Dub" Taylor and Ken Douglas. In the summer of 1969 they released Bob Dylan "GWW" Great White Wonder with a white fold out cover and white labels. Another 9 titles followed before they in 1970 created the "farm pig" logo and the TMQ label was a fact and they began fastening round fluorescent stickers on the outside of their rubber stamped jackets which read 'Trade Mark Of Quality,' and bore the profile of a farm pig. The Frank Zappa - 200 Motels release was the first to bear such a sticker. Over time, custom pig labels were added along with xerox insert covers.

In late 1971 the two split up the partnership and started a "friendly competition". In the beginning, Ken's releases were ( nearly ) exact copies of Dub's. They were made with the same stamping plates, similar labels, stickers and inserts. During 1973, Dub went to deluxe covers to differentiate between his and Ken's records. Ken, at the time, had no way to duplicate the deluxe covers. Also during 1973, Ken began using the smoking pig logo on his labels instead of the farm pig. Dub went until 1974 and briefly returned in 1976 and 1977 with a small series of deluxe covered titles before dropping out entirely.

Ken continued with his "Smoking pig" label until 1976. This article list the records released by the label and is divided into two sections.

TMOQ (I) = Dub&Ken era (II) = Ken "smoking pig" era

TMOQ (I) single LPs :
71001 – Bob Dylan – Stealin
71002 – Bob Dylan – John Birch Society Blues
71003 – Rolling Stones – Live'r Than You'll Ever Be
71004 – Donovan – The Ready River
71005 – Jethro Tull – My God
71006 – Bob Dylan – While the Establishment Burns
71007 – The Beatles – In Atlanta Whiskey Flat
71008 – Bob Dylan – Seems Like A Freeze Out
71009 – Bob Dylan – Talkin Bear Mountain Massacre Picnic Blues
71010 – Frank Zappa / Mothers – 200 Motels
71011 – Jefferson Airplane – Up Against The wall
71012 – The Beatles – Last Live Show
71013 – CSN&Y – Ohio Wooden Nickel
71014 – Paul Simon – The Paul Simon Solo Album
71015 – The Beatles – Complete Christmas Collection 1963 – 69	
71016 – Rod Stewart & the Faces – Plynth
71017 – Bob Dylan – Royal Albert Hall
71018 – Jimi Hendrix – Maui Hawaii
71019 – Jimi Hendrix – Broadcasts
71020 – Rolling Stones – European Tour 1970
71021 – Rolling Stones – Beautiful Delilah
71022 – Neil Young – At The Los Angeles Music centre
71023 – Janis Joplin – Infinity Blues
71024 – The Beatles – Get Back Sessions
71025 – The Beatles – Renaissance Minstrels 1
71026 – The Beatles – Renaissance Minstrels 2
71027 – Bob Dylan – VD Waltz
71028 – Jimi Hendrix – Smashing Amps
71029 – Rolling Stones – London Roundhouse
71030 – Jethro Tull – Nothing Is Easy - pink vinyl JT – 511 etched in off trail wax
71031 – Blood Sweat & Tears – BS&T 5
71032 – The Beatles – Yellow Matter Custard
71033 – Bob Dylan – Burn Some More
71034 – Bob Dylan – Best Of Great White Wonder
71035 – Buffalo Springfield, Neil Young, CSN&Y – Springfield Roots
71036 – Cat Stevens – Father & Son
71037 – Grateful Dead – In Concert
71038 – Jefferson Airplane – Winterland 1970 / Tapes from The Mothership
71039 – The Who – Closer To Queen Mary
71040 – Pink Floyd – Omayyad
71041 – Led Zeppelin – Mudslide
71042 – Jimi Hendrix – Good Vibes
71043 – Bob Dylan – Let Me Die In My Footsteps
71044 – Jethro Tull – Flute Cake
71045 – Bob Dylan – Troubled Troubador
71046 – John Lennon – Telecasts
71047 – Leon Russell – Session
71048 – The Beatles – Outtakes 1
71049 – The Beatles – Outtakes 2
71050 – Bob Dylan – Isle Of Wight
71051 – Bob Dylan – Blind Boy Grunt
71052 – Rod Stewart & The Faces – Had me A Real Good Time
71053 – Moody Blues – Bushbuck
71054 – David Bowie – In Person
71055 – Bob Dylan – The Demo Tapes
71056 – Pete Townshend – The Genius Of ...
71057 – Rolling Stones – Burning At The Hollywood Palladium 1972
71058 – Grateful Dead – San Francisco 1
71059 – Frank Zappa & Hot Rats – At The Olympic
71060 – Jimi Hendrix – Good Karma
71061 – Bob Dylan – Don't Look Back
71062 – David Bowie – In America
71063 – Neil Young – Boulder, Colorado
71064 – Grateful Dead – Hollywood Palladium 1
71065 – The Beatles – Hollywood Bowl 1964
71066 – Yes – On Tour
71067 – Deep Purple – Purple For A Day
71068 – The Beatles – Get Back Session 2
71069 – Bob Dylan – BBC Broadcast     (Only exist as a double LP with a single LP serial number) 
71070 – Led Zeppelin – BBC Broadcast
71071 – The Who – Fillmore East
71072 – Neil Young – BBC Broadcast
71073 – Santana – Hot & Alive
71074 – David Bowie – All American Bowie		
71075 – Rolling Stones – Bright Lights Big City
71076 – The Beatles – Spicy Beatles Songs
71077 – The Who – Radio London
71078 – Rolling Stones – San diego '69
71079 – Jimi Hendrix – Good Karma 2
71080 – Rolling Stones – Welcome To New York
71081 – The Yardbirds – Rarities
71082 – Derek and the Dominos – Stormy Monday
71083 – Bob Dylan – Early 60s Revisited
71084 – The Kinks – Long Tall Sally
71085 – Bad Company – Boblingen
71086 – Rolling Stones – European Tour '73
KEYLO102 – Leon Russell – Recorded live from an earlier Broadcast
MR1369 – Elton John – Country Comfort
1816 – Rolling Stones – Stone Relics
1817 – Rod Stewart & the Faces – Dancing in the street
1844 – Procol Harum – Shine on live
1845 – Jethro Tull – Ticketon
1852 – Led Zeppelin – Stairway To Heaven
1859 – Leon Russell – Oakie from Tulsa
1867 – Rod Stewart & the Faces – Performance

TMOQ (I) double LPs :
72001 – Bob Dylan – Great White Wonder
72002 – Led Zeppelin – Live On Blueberry Hill
72003 – Jimi Hendrix – Hendrix Alive
72004 – Led Zeppelin – Going to California
72005 – David Crosby & Graham Nash – A Very Stoney Evening
72006 – Rolling Stones – Winter Tour 1973 (All Meat Music)
72007 – Led Zeppelin – Bonzo's Birthday Party
72008 – Grateful Dead – Out West Hollywood Palladium 2
72009 – Rolling Stones – Gimme Shelter
72010 – Jethro Tull – Forum '73
72011 – Rolling Stones – Summer Reruns
72012 – The Beatles – Vancouver
72013 – Alice Cooper – You're All Crazier Than I Am ( Only exist with "Smoking Pig" label ) 
72014 – Grateful Dead – Filmore West
72015 – Jethro Tull – Supercharged ( Only exist with "Smoking Pig" label )
72016 – Led Zeppelin – Three Days After ( Only exist with "Smoking Pig" label ) 
72017 – Rolling Stones – Mick's Birthday Party ( Only exist with "Smoking pig" label )
72018 – The Who – Jaguar   ( Only exist with "Smoking Pig" label )
72019 – Led Zeppelin – V-1/2   ( Only exist with "Smoking Pig" label )
1401 – Paul McCartney& Wings – In concert in Copenhagen
1847/2810 – David Bowie – Live At Santa Monica Civic
2804 – Pink Floyd – Live (aka Cymbaline)
2806 – Rolling Stones – Get Your Rocks Off

TMOQ (I) double LPs budget series:	
7501 – Bob Dylan – BBC Broadcast
7502 – Jimi Hendrix – Broadcasts / Maui Hawaii
7503 – Jethro Tull – My God / Nothing Is Easy
7504 – The Who & Townshend – Closer To Queen Mary / Genius Of Pete Townshend
7505 – Rolling Stones – European Tour 1970 / Burning At The Hollywood Palladium
7506 – Frank Zappa – 200 Motels / At The Lympic
7507 – Bob Dylan – While The Establishment Burns / Isle Of Wight
7508 – The Beatles – Outtakes 1 / Outtakes 2
7509 – Jimi Hendrix – Hendrix Alive ( Released with "Stout die-cut cover" and on MCV )
7510 – David Crosby & Graham Nash – A Very Stoney Evening

TMOQ (I) 7" single series :		
9001 – Rolling Stones – Cops and Robbers
9002 – Bad Company – In Concert

TMOQ (I) single LP deluxe series :
61001 – Yardbirds – Golden Eggs
61002 – Bob Dylan – Melbourne Australia 1966
61003 – Yardbirds – More Golden Eggs

TMOQ (I) double LP deluxe series :
62001 – The Who – Who's Zoo
62002 – The Who – Tales Of The Who

TMOQ (I) triple LP deluxe series :
63001 – Bob Dylan – Saint Valentine's Day Massacre

TMOQ (I) single LP deluxe series :
8201 – Deep Purple – Murky Waters
8202 – Pink Floyd – Nippon Connection
8203 – Pink Floyd – Circus Days
8204 – Jeff Beck – Beckfast

TMOQ (I) double LP deluxe series : 
8205/6 – Paul McCartney – Great Dane
8207/8 – Rolling Stones – LA Fog

TMOQ (II) single LPs :
73000 – Donovan – The Reedy River
73001 – The Beatles – Renaissance Minstrels 1
73002 – The Beatles – Renaissance Minstrels 2
73003 – Buffalo Springfield – Springfield Roots
73005 – Bob Dylan – While The Establishment Burns
73006 – Bob Dylan – Burn Some More
73007 – Bob Dylan – Blind Boy Grunt
73008 – Bob Dylan – Best Of The Great White Wonder
73009 – Grateful Dead – Live In Concert
73010 – Grateful Dead – Silent Dead
73011 – Jimi Hendrix – Maui Hawaii
73012 – Jimi Hendrix – Broadcasts
73013 – Jimi Hendrix – Smashing Amps
73014 – Jethro Tull – My God
73015 – Jethro Tull – Ticketron
73016 – The Kinks – Kriminal
73017 – Led Zeppelin – Stairway To Heaven
73018 – Paul McCartney – James Paul McCartney		
73019 – Moody Blues – Answer To The Mystery Of Life
73020 – Van Morrison – A Spawn Of The Dublin Pubs
73021 – Rod Stewart – Had Me A Real Good Time
73022 – Rolling Stones – Stone Relics
73023 – Rolling Stones – European Tour 1970
73024 – Rolling Stones – Burning At The Hollywood Palladium
73025 – Rolling Stones – Smooth
73026 – Pete Townshend – The Genius Of
73027 – Johnny Winter – Hot & Alive
73028 – Neil Young – Coming Home
73030 – The Beatles – The Beatles
73031 – Jimi Hendrix – Skyhigh
73032 – The Beatles – Renaissance Minstrels 3
73033 – Rolling Stones – Get Your Leeds Lungs Out
73034 – Bob Dylan – Bridgett's Album
73035 – Van Morrison – Belfast Cowboy
73036 – Poco – Country Bump
73037 – Randy Newman – Live At Paul's Mall Boston
73038 – Joni Mitchell – Lights out In Georgia
73039 – Elton John – More rock from Elton
1704 – Beatles – Hollywood Bowl
1800 – The Beatles – Last live show
1802 – Bob Dylan – Stealin
1803 – Bob Dylan – John Birch Society Blues
1804 – Bob Dylan – Talking Bear Mountain Massacre Picnic Blues
1805 – Bob Dylan – Seems Like A Freeze Out
1807 – Neil Young –  Live at The Los Angeles Music Center 
1809 – Cat Stevens – Father & son
1810 – Jefferson Airplane – Winterland 1970 / Tapes from The Mothership
1811 – Rolling Stones – Live'r Than You'll Ever Be
1812 – Rolling Stones – London Roundhouse
1813 - Jimi Hendrix  - "Royal Albert Hall, London, 24 February 1969"
1817 – Rod Stewart & the Faces – Dancing in the street
1818 – Bob Dylan – GWW Royal Albert Hall
1824 – Beatles – In Atlanta Whiskey flats
1825 – Leon Russell – Recorded live from an earlier broadcast ( A Keylo production )
1826 – Led Zeppelin – Mudslide
1827 – Jethro Tull – Nothing is easy
1828 – Jethro Tull – Flute cake
1830 – Pink Floyd – Omayyad
1831 – The Who – Closer to Queen Mary
1832 – Rod Stewart & the Faces – Plynth
1834 – John Lennon – Telecast
1837 – Traffic – Traffic jam
1839 – Jefferson Airplane – Up Against The wall
1842 – Frank Zappa / Mothers – 200 Motels
1844 – Procol Harum – Shine on live
1846 – The Who – Fillmore East
1849 – Bob Dylan – Burn Some More
1850 – Jimi Hendrix – Good Vibes
1851 – Jimi Hendrix – Good Karma
1854 – Bob Dylan – VD Waltz
1855 – Bob Dylan – Isle of Wight
1856 – Bob Dylan – Troubled Troubador
1858 – The Beatles – Yellow Matter Custard
1859 – Leon Russell – Oakie from Tulsa
1861 – Bob Dylan – GWW The Demo tapes
1862 – Bob Dylan – Don't look back
1867 – Rod Stewart & the Faces – Performance
1888 – David Bowie – The All American Bowie
1889 – Rolling Stones – San Diego '69
1890 – Rolling Stones – Bright Lights Big City
1892 – The Beatles – Spicy Beatles songs
1894 – Neil Young – BBC Broadcast
71082 – Derek and the Dominos – Stormy Monday
71085 – Bad Company – Boblingen
KEYLO102 – Leon Russell – Recorded live from an earlier Broadcast
2815C/D – Rolling Stones – Welcome to New York
BlindBoy9 – Bob Dylan – Blind Boy Grunt
RAH 115 – Bob Dylan – GWW Royal Albert Hall (B&W wrap around cover)
BD001 – Bob Dylan – Let me die in my footsteps

TMOQ (II) double LPs :
2800 – Bob Dylan – Great White Wonder
2801 – Led Zeppelin – Live On Blueberry Hill
2802 – Jimi Hendrix – Hendrix Alive (probably does not exist)
2804 – Pink Floyd – Live (aka Cymbaline) 
2805 – Grateful Dead – Out West Fillmore West
2806 – Rolling Stones – Get your rocks off
1847/2810 – David Bowie – Live At Santa Monica Civic
2811 – Rolling Stones – Winter Tour 1973 (All Meat Music)
2816 – Led Zeppelin – Bonzo's Birthday Party
2820 – Led Zeppelin – Live in Seattle
XCN1/2/3/4 – David Crosby & Graham Nash – A Very Stony Evening
LZ1234 – Led Zeppelin – Going to California
JT538 – Jethro Tull – Forum '73

See also
 List of record labels

References
Clinton Heylin (1996). Bootleg: The Secret History of the Other Recording Industry. New York: St. Martin's Griffin. .

Hot Wacks Press (1996). Hot Wacks Book XV : The last Wacks. Canada: The Hot Wacks Press. .

John C. Winn (2011). Beatlegmania: Volume Four. New York : Multiplus Books. .

Defunct record labels of the United States
Bootleg recordings
Discographies of American record labels